Ohope Beach Primary School is located in Ōhope, 6 kilometres from Whakatāne, on the Northeast Coast of the North Island in New Zealand.

The school
Ohope Beach Primary School contains a field, a hall, swimming pool, five classrooms in a large building, and an office. The school is a state school that caters for Years 1-6 and has approximately 320 students. The principal, Cathryn Naera, took over from Tony Horsefall, who had been with the school since 2010.

New Building
In 2015, Associate Education Minister Nikki Kaye announced a $13.5m redevelopment for Ohope Beach Primary School. The redevelopment contains a two-storey block containing 12 teaching spaces, along with an administration block, library, car parking, drop-off areas, and outdoor teaching spaces. The redevelopment project was completed in 2018.

References

External links
Ohope Beach Primary School Website

Primary schools in New Zealand
Schools in the Bay of Plenty Region